The Mylan Classic was a golf tournament on the Web.com Tour. It was played for the first time in September 2010 at Southpointe Golf Club in Canonsburg, Pennsylvania, a suburb of Pittsburgh. The title sponsor was Mylan, a pharmaceuticals company based in Canonsburg. Beginning in 2013, the tournament will invite top collegiate players to the event as the Nationwide Children's Hospital Invitational had done from 2007 to 2012.

The 2013 purse was US$675,000, with $121,500 going to the winner.

Winners

Bolded golfers graduated to the PGA Tour via the Web.com Tour regular-season money list.

References

External links
Coverage on the Web.com Tour's official site

Former Korn Ferry Tour events
Golf in Pittsburgh
Recurring sporting events established in 2010
Recurring sporting events disestablished in 2013
2010 establishments in Pennsylvania
2013 disestablishments in Pennsylvania